Jean-Marie Delwart is a Belgian businessman.

Career
He is Chairman of Belgocodex S.A., Chairman of Biotec S.A., Chairman of Hoccinvest S.A., and he is a member of the Belgian business club Cercle de Lorraine.

Foundation
He founded the Jean-Marie Delwart Foundation, which rewards original research in Chemical Communication and in Ethology/Cultural Anthropology.

Sources
 Floridienne
 Foundation Jean-Marie Delwart

Belgian businesspeople
Walloon people
Living people
Year of birth missing (living people)